Tefert El Fougania is a village in the commune of Abalessa, in Tamanrasset Province, Algeria.

References

Neighbouring towns and cities

Populated places in Tamanrasset Province